The Moro V Cabinet, led by Aldo Moro, was the 32nd cabinet of the Italian Republic.

The government obtained confidence on 21 February 1976 in the Chamber of Deputies, with 287 votes in favor, 220 against and 60 abstentions, and on 25 February in the Senate, with 141 votes in favor and 113 against.

Composition

|}

References

Italian governments
1976 establishments in Italy
1976 disestablishments in Italy
Cabinets established in 1976
Cabinets disestablished in 1976
Aldo Moro